Morro da Boa Vista is the highest mountain in the Brazilian state of Santa Catarina, the highest at Serra Geral and the third highest in Southern Brazil, after Pico Paraná and Pico Caratuva, at . The peak can get quite cold during winter, with the possibility of snowfall. It is about 91 km north-east of Pico do Monte Negro, another Brazilian state record holder. It is 21 km south-east of Bom Retiro, Santa Catarina.

See also 
Morro da Igreja

References 

Mountains of Brazil
Landforms of Santa Catarina (state)
Highest points of Brazilian states